This is a list of comedy films released in the 1970s.

1970s

1970
Kelly's Heroes*
The Boatniks
Catch-22
The Cheyenne Social Club
The Computer Wore Tennis Shoes
Doctor in Trouble
Hi, Mom!
Hoffman
M*A*S*H
Myra Breckinridge
The Out-of-Towners
The Owl and the Pussycat
There's a Girl in My Soup
The Twelve Chairs
Start the Revolution Without Me
There Was a Crooked Man...
Which Way to the Front?
Little Big Man

1971
Dollars
200 Motels
And Now For Something Completely Different
The Barefoot Executive
B.S. I Love You
Bananas
Carnal Knowledge
Dad's Army
Happy Birthday, Wanda June
Harold and Maude
The Hospital
Melody
The Million Dollar Duck
A New Leaf
Support Your Local Gunfighter!
Up Pompeii!
Who Is Harry Kellerman and Why Is He Saying Those Terrible Things About Me?
 Willy Wonka & the Chocolate Factory

1972
Another Nice Mess
Avanti!
Bless This House
Everything You Always Wanted to Know About Sex* (*But Were Afraid to Ask)
Every Little Crook and Nanny
Fritz the Cat
The Heartbreak Kid
Now You See Him, Now You Don't
On the Buses
Pink Flamingos
Play It Again, Sam
Pulp
Snowball Express
Steptoe and Son (1972) and sequel Steptoe and Son Ride Again
The Thing with Two Heads
Up the Chastity Belt
Up the Front
What's Up, Doc?
Where Does It Hurt?
With Children at the Seaside

1973
American Graffiti
Blume in Love
Charley and the Angel
Cops and Robbers
Five on the Black Hand Side
Harry in Your Pocket
The Last Detail
Paper Moon
Sleeper
Soft Beds, Hard Battles
The Sting

1974
Blazing Saddles
Dark Star
Down and Dirty Duck
Flesh Gordon
Ginger in the Morning
The Girl from Petrovka
The Great McGonagall
The Groove Tube
Harry and Tonto
Herbie Rides Again
The House in Nightmare Park
The Longest Yard
Man About the House
The Nine Lives of Fritz the Cat
Phantom of the Paradise
Rhinoceros
Superdad
The Thorn
Thunderbolt and Lightfoot
Uptown Saturday Night
Young Frankenstein

1975
The Adventure of Sherlock Holmes' Smarter Brother
The Apple Dumpling Gang
The Fortune
Let's Do It Again
Love and Death
Monty Python and the Holy Grail
One of Our Dinosaurs Is Missing
The Return of the Pink Panther
The Rocky Horror Picture Show
Rooster Cogburn
Shampoo
The Strongest Man in the World
The Sunshine Boys

1976
Adiós Amigo
The Bad News Bears
The Big Bus
The Bingo Long Traveling All-Stars & Motor Kings
Cannonball
Car Wash
Chesty Anderson, USN
Confessions of a Driving Instructor
Confessions of a Pop Performer
Confessions of a Window Cleaner
The Duchess and the Dirtwater Fox
Family Plot
Freaky Friday
The Gumball Rally
Gus
Keep It Up Downstairs
The Likely Lads
Mother, Jugs & Speed
Murder by Death
Network
Nickelodeon
No Deposit, No Return
The Pink Panther Strikes Again 
The Plank (1979) — remake of the 1967 film
Porridge (1979)
The Shaggy D.A.
Silent Movie
Silver Streak
Tunnel Vision

1977
Annie Hall
Confessions from a Holiday Camp
The Bad News Bears in Breaking Training
Candleshoe
Desperate Living
Grand Theft Auto
Handle with Care
Herbie Goes to Monte Carlo
High Anxiety
Jabberwocky
The Kentucky Fried Movie
The World's Greatest Lover
The Last Remake of Beau Geste
Oh, God!
A Piece of the Action
Semi-Tough
Slap Shot
Smokey and the Bandit
Which Way Is Up?

1978
A Wedding
The Bad News Bears Go to Japan
California Suite
The Cat from Outer Space
The Cheap Detective
Corvette Summer
Every Which Way But Loose
Foul Play
Goin' South
Heaven Can Wait
Hooper
Hot Lead and Cold Feet
National Lampoon's Animal House
Rabbit Test
Revenge of the Pink Panther
Sextette
Sgt. Pepper's Lonely Hearts Club Band
The End
Up in Smoke

1979
10
1941
Americathon
The Apple Dumpling Gang Rides Again
Being There
Breaking Away
The Frisco Kid
Hot Stuff
The In-Laws
The Jerk
Love at First Bite
Lovers and Liars
The Main Event
Manhattan
Monty Python's Life of Brian
The Muppet Movie
The North Avenue Irregulars
The Prisoner of Zenda
Real Life
Richard Pryor: Live in Concert
Rock 'n' Roll High School
Starting Over
The Villain

1970's British films
And Now For Something Completely Different (1971)
Bless This House (1972)
Confessions from a Holiday Camp (1977)
Confessions of a Driving Instructor (1976)
Confessions of a Pop Performer (1976)
Confessions of a Window Cleaner and other sex comedies supported by the Eady levy
Dad's Army (1971)
Doctor in Trouble (1970)
Hoffman (1970)
The House in Nightmare Park (1973)
Jabberwocky (1977)
Keep It Up Downstairs (1976)
The Likely Lads (1976)
Man About the House (1974)
Melody (1971)
Monty Python and the Holy Grail (1975)
Monty Python's Life of Brian (1979)
On the Buses (1972) (and two sequels)
The Pink Panther Strikes Again (1976)
The Plank (1979) — remake of the 1967 film
Porridge (1979)
Pulp (1972)
The Return of the Pink Panther (1974)
Soft Beds, Hard Battles (1973)
Steptoe and Son (1972) and sequel Steptoe and Son Ride Again
There's a Girl in My Soup (1970)
Up the Chastity Belt (1972)
Up the Front (1972)
Up Pompeii! (1971)

Comedy-horror
1971
The Abominable Dr. Phibes

1972
Children Shouldn't Play with Dead Things
Dr. Phibes Rises Again
The Gore Gore Girls
Please Don't Eat My Mother
Private Parts

1973
Theatre of Blood
The Werewolf of Washington

1974
The Cars That Ate Paris

1975
The Rocky Horror Picture Show

1976
Murder By Death

1977
 House

1978
Piranha

1979
Love at First Bite

Comedy-drama
Diary of a Mad Housewife (1970)
Carnal Knowledge (1971)
The Longest Yard (1974)
Female Trouble (1975)
One Flew Over the Cuckoo's Nest (1975)
Cannonball (1976)
Don's Party (1976)
The Judge and the Assassin (1976)
Convoy (1978)
Autumn Marathon (1979) (USSR)
Breaking Away (1979)

Parody films
Blazing Saddles (1974)
Hardware Wars (1977)
High Anxiety (1977)
Monty Python and the Holy Grail (1970s)
Young Frankenstein (1970s)

References

1970s

Comedy